Anne Marie Malone (born July 28, 1960 in Toronto, Ontario) is a retired Canadian female long-distance runner. She competed for her native country at the 1984 Summer Olympics in Los Angeles, California. There she placed 17th in the women's marathon. She set her personal best in the classic distance (2:33.00) in 1984. She also represented Canada at the 1982 World Cross Country Championships, where she placed 39th and the team placed 5th. At the 1983 World Cross Country Championships, she place 16th, and team Canada took the bronze medal in the team competition with a score of 53 points. On both teams Anne Marie was the third placing runner for Canada.

Achievements
All results regarding marathon, unless stated otherwise

References

 

1960 births
Athletes from Toronto
Athletes (track and field) at the 1984 Summer Olympics
Canadian female long-distance runners
Canadian female marathon runners
Living people
Olympic track and field athletes of Canada